The swimming events at the 2010 South American Games were held from March 23, 25 and 26-29; and were grouped into two disciplines: (pool) swimming and open water swimming.

Events were contested at:
Open water (4 events): a reservoir next to Guatapé, (just west of Medellín);
Swimming (40 events): March 26–29 at the Complejo Acuatico (trans: "Aquatic Complex") in Medellín.

Event schedule

Open Water schedule
Tuesday, March 23: 5-kilometer race (5K) 
Thursday, March 25: 10-kilometer race (10K)

Pool finals schedule

Results

Men's events

Women's events

Medal standings

References

 
2010 South American Games
South American Games
2010 South American Games